The Bishop of Nottingham is the Ordinary of the Roman Catholic Diocese of Nottingham in the Province of Westminster.

The see is in the City of Nottingham where the bishop's seat is located at the Cathedral Church of St. Barnabas, Nottingham. 

The Diocese of Nottingham was erected on 29 September 1850, mainly from out of the Vicariate Apostolic of the Central District, and partly from the Eastern District.

List of the Bishops of the Roman Catholic Diocese of Nottingham, England

References 

 
Roman Catholic Diocese of Nottingham
Post-Reformation Roman Catholic bishops in England